BeBe K'Roche was an American all-female electric rock band with Olivia Records. They were the first all woman band with the label which is the first woman-owned women's music label. Olivia was known to be most successful with acoustic solo acts, and at that time the decision to record an electric rock band was somewhat controversial.

Members
Founding members: Pamela "Tiik" Pollet, Peggy Mitchell, Janet (Jake) Lampert, Virginia Rubino 
Occasional members: Pat Ramseyer, Matu Feliciano, Sandi Adjida, Robin Flower, Cyndy Mason
Personal manager: Kim JohnsonRoad manager: Gioia Siciiano
Recording/Record tour members: Peggy Mitchell, Janet (Jake) Lampert, Virginia Rubino, Matu Feliciano, Jerene O'Brien, Robin Flower, Jasmin Telfair, Linda Tillery

History
BeBe K'Roche was founded in 1973 by electric guitarist/singer-songwriter Tiik Pollet in Berkeley, California, while playing in a duo with bassist Peggy Mitchell. Mitchell also played regularly with Bay Area jazz pianist David Alexander. Pollet, a rocker who put her feminist politics into her music, sought kindred women rockers and found drummer/singer-songwriter Janet (Jake) Lampert, who was the original drummer for the Berkeley Women's Music Collective. They were later joined by pianist/singer-songwriter Virginia Rubino, who had played with Tiik in the Venice Beach-based women's band Lizzie Tisch, and recorded with the all women's band High Risk.

The name BeBe K'Roche was created by Pollet, inspired by the sight of a baby cockroach in a cup of tea and an attempt to lessen the impact by making it sound exotically French.

BeBe K'Roche toured the US West Coast playing the San Diego Women's Music Festival, the Santa Cruz Women's Music Festival and many venues from Hollywood to Seattle. BeBe K'Roche recorded a demo tape at Blue Bear Studios in the Bay Area and later went to vinyl with Olivia Records.

Although the band officially broke up because of internal conflicts before completing the Olivia recording, in an effort to complete the recording, they regrouped, wrote new songs, and added Jerene O'Brien on electric guitar.

Discography
 BeBe K'Roche (Olivia Records, 1976) 
Produced by Linda Tillery, engineered by Sandy Stone, recorded and mixed at Different Fur in San Francisco

Song Titles and writing credits: Hoodoo'd (Virginia Rubino), Gotta Make Something Of My Life (Rubino and Gwen Avery), Understand (Rubino), Kahlua Mama (Rubino and Gioia Siciliano), Strong and Free (Janet (Jake) Lampert, composer, and Joan Gelfand, lyricist), I Got The Rhythm (Rubino), Smile (Rubino), Alone (Rubino)

See also
 Women's music

References

External links
 tiik.com
 
 
 Article on Matu Feliciano

All-female bands
Musical groups established in 1973
Rock music groups from California
1973 establishments in California
Women's music